Walter E. Moore House is a historic home located at Webster, Jackson County, North Carolina. The house was built in 1886, and is a -story, three bay by one bay, "T"-plan, Vernacular Victorian-style frame dwelling, with a one-story original rear ell.  It has a hipped roof porch with turned posts, balusters, and sawnwork brackets.  Also on the property are the contributing well house and shed.

It was listed on the National Register of Historic Places in 1990.

References

Houses on the National Register of Historic Places in North Carolina
Victorian architecture in North Carolina
Houses completed in 1886
Houses in Jackson County, North Carolina
National Register of Historic Places in Jackson County, North Carolina